Martin Leslie McGrath (born 23 February 1984) is an indigenous former  Australian rules football player who played in the AFL in 2003 for the Richmond Football Club.  He is the cousin of footballers Ashley, Toby and Cory McGrath.

He kicked five goals in his debut match in 2003, but only kicked one more in his career before he was delisted at the end of the season.  He remained in Victoria and has played for Templestowe in the Eastern Football League and Lalor in the Diamond Valley Football League.

In July 2020, McGrath was charged with causing bodily harm after allegedly throwing a brick at a teenager dangerously riding a motorcycle which he had stolen from Mr McGrath and taunted him by driving around him over and over along with pulling the middle finger on him. He escaped from custody after facing Perth Magistrates Court in August, but turned himself in to police the next day pleading guilty.

References

External links
 
 

1984 births
Living people
Richmond Football Club players
South Fremantle Football Club players
Coburg Football Club players
Lalor Football Club players
Indigenous Australian players of Australian rules football
Australian rules footballers from Western Australia